The Explosion is the self-titled debut EP from The Explosion. It was released in 2000 on Jade Tree Records. All the tracks featured were originally part of a demo sold on The Explosion's tour with Kid Dynamite.

Track listing
"These Times"
"Hero"
"Out Tonight"
"Youth Explosion"
"Channels"
"Simple Lives"

The Explosion albums
2000 EPs
Jade Tree (record label) EPs